Mushtaq Shiekh is an Indian screenwriter, author, producer and actor. He is mainly known for writing the screenplays of Ra.One, Om Shanti Om and Billu.

Early life

Shiekh was born in Maharashtra. He also wrote the script for Priyadarshan's Rangrezz. He authored the biography of Indian actor Shahrukh Khan titled Still Reading Khan.

Career

Shiekh has written several books about movies in India. During a visit to a book fair of Abu Dhabi, he said "I wish more books were written about movies for people who are genuinely interested in knowing how this art form is made." He worked as an associate producer in Anubhav Sinha's Mulk (2018). He has also worked with Indian TV channel Sahara One as a creative director.

Shiekh is writing a book for children titled "Blue Forest". He told reporters that the book will be released in 2019. The book tells the story of a magical forest. He is also writing a web series for Ekta Kapoor's ALTBalaji.

Other work

Mushtaq Shiekh organised a campaign to support daily wages workers of the Indian television industry during the COVID-19 pandemic in India. Along with television producer Ekta Kapoor, filmmaker Tigmanshu Dhulia and TV actor Karan Patel and many others, a fund was created to support workers from TV industry who lost their jobs.

Filmography

Television career

Books

References

External links 

 

Indian male screenwriters
Living people
Date of birth missing (living people)
Year of birth missing (living people)
21st-century Indian dramatists and playwrights
Screenwriters from Maharashtra
Screenwriters from Mumbai